Cyril Harvey Toulouse (24 December 1923 in Acton – 22 January 1980) was an English professional footballer who played for Brentford, Tottenham Hotspur, Guildford City and Oxford United.

Playing career
Toulouse joined Brentford from non-league St Cuthmans in May 1946. The wing half featured in 13 matches between 1946 and 1947. He signed for Tottenham Hotspur in December 1947 and made his debut for the Spurs in a fixture versus WBA on 11 September 1948. Toulouse played two senior matches for the White Hart Lane club. After leaving Tottenham he had a spell at Guildford City before joining Oxford United in 1950. Toulouse went on to feature in 152 matches and netting 20 goals between 1950 and 1954.

References

1923 births
1980 deaths
Footballers from Acton, London
English footballers
English Football League players
Brentford F.C. players
Tottenham Hotspur F.C. players
Guildford City F.C. players
Oxford United F.C. players
Association football wing halves